Qaāgai is a village in Khyber-Pakhtunkhwa province of Pakistan.

References

Populated places in Khyber Pakhtunkhwa